The Inheritors is the second studio album by British electronic music producer James Holden, released on 24 June 2013 by Border Community.

Holden had not intended to perform live, but he put together a live show after Thom Yorke requested he support on a North American tour with Atoms for Peace. He recruited drummer Tom Page (of experimental electronic duo Rocketnumbernine and The Memory Band) and has worked with him ever since.

Critical reception

Many critics noted a stylistic departure from Holden's debut and praised his innovations within electronic music. The Quietus wrote, "If Holden was already starting to push the boundaries on his debut, The Inheritors is techno music not so much fragmented as smashed into tiny pieces; rocks ground into sand and cast into the ether." Derek Miller of Resident Advisor portrayed the music on the album as experimental.

The Inheritors was named Resident Advisors album of the year and featured on several other year-end lists, including those of The Quietus, The Wire, Drowned in Sound and Bleep.

Track listing

References

Border Community albums
James Holden (producer) albums
2013 albums